Tumbarumba Creek, a watercourse of the Murray catchment within the Murray–Darling basin, is located in the region bordering the Riverina and Australian Alps of New South Wales, Australia.

Course and features
The creek rises below Tumbarumba Hill, south of Laurel Hill, on the western slopes of the Snowy Mountains, and its natural flow drains generally south, joined by three tributaries including Paddys River, before reaching its confluence with the Tooma River, south of the village of Tooma; descending  over its  course.

See also

 List of rivers of New South Wales (L–Z)
 Snowy Mountains
 Rivers of New South Wales
 Rivers of Australia

References

External links
 

Rivers of New South Wales
Murray-Darling basin
Rivers in the Riverina
Snowy Valleys Council